D mol were a Montenegrin vocal group that represented their country in the 2019 Eurovision Song Contest in Tel Aviv.

They were selected to represent Montenegro in the 2019 contest after winning the country's national selection, Montevizija. They performed their entry, "Heaven", in the first half of the first semi-final in Tel Aviv where they failed to qualify for the final. The group's name was originally spelt D-Moll but in early March 2019 it was confirmed as D mol.

Members
Rizo Feratović was born on 15 November 1997 in Dragaš.
Željko Vukčević was born on 8 January 2000 in Podgorica.
Ivana Obradović was born on 21 February 2000 in Bijelo Polje.
Emel Franca was born on 12 August 2000 in Bijelo Polje.
Mirela Ljumić was born on 12 March 2001 in Podgorica.
Tamara Vujačić was born on 5 August 2002 in Podgorica.

Discography

Singles

References

Eurovision Song Contest entrants of 2019
Eurovision Song Contest entrants for Montenegro
Montenegrin musical groups